Jelša (in older sources also Jelše) is a small settlement north of Blagovica in the Municipality of Lukovica in the eastern part of the Upper Carniola region of Slovenia. The settlement includes the hamlets of Brdar, Mlinar, Spodnja Jelša, Srednjek, and Zgornja Jelša.

References

External links 
 
Jelša on Geopedia

Populated places in the Municipality of Lukovica